The 2020–21 PFC Sochi season was Sochi's second season in the Russian Premier League, the highest tier of association football in Russia, and their third season as a club. Sochi finished the season in 5th position, qualifying for the UEFA Europa Conference League for the first time, and reached the Quarterfinals of the Russian Cup where they were eliminated by eventual champions Lokomotiv Moscow.

Season events
On 7 August, Emanuel Mammana moved to Sochi on a season-long loan deal from Zenit St.Petersburg.

On 23 August, Sochi and Rostov agreed a swap deal with Ivelin Popov joining Sochi and Dmitry Poloz returning to Rostov.

Squad

Out on loan

Transfers

In

Loans in

Out

Loans out

Competitions

Overview

Premier League

League table

Results summary

Results by round

Results

Russian Cup

Round of 32

Knockout stage

Squad statistics

Appearances and goals

|-
|colspan="14"|Players away from the club on loan:

|-
|colspan="14"|Players who appeared for Sochi but left during the season:

|}

Goal scorers

Clean sheets

Disciplinary record

References

PFC Sochi seasons
Sochi